Milán Matos (12 November 1949 – 16 March 2018) was a Cuban athlete. He competed in the men's long jump at the 1972 Summer Olympics and the 1976 Summer Olympics.

References

1949 births
2018 deaths
Athletes (track and field) at the 1972 Summer Olympics
Athletes (track and field) at the 1976 Summer Olympics
Cuban male long jumpers
Olympic athletes of Cuba
Athletes (track and field) at the 1975 Pan American Games
Pan American Games competitors for Cuba
Place of birth missing
Central American and Caribbean Games medalists in athletics
20th-century Cuban people
21st-century Cuban people